The Davutoğlu Government can refer to three different governments of Turkey, which were formed and led by Prime Minister Ahmet Davutoğlu.
First Davutoğlu Cabinet 
2015 interim election government of Turkey 
Third Davutoğlu Cabinet